Muhammad Ali Jinnah's 11 August Speech is a speech made by Muhammad Ali Jinnah, founding father of Pakistan and known as Quaid-e-Azam (Great Leader) to the Constituent Assembly of Pakistan. While Pakistan was created as a result of what could be described as Indian Muslim nationalism, Jinnah was once an ambassador of Hindu-Muslim unity. When the Partition of India finally occurred, Jinnah, soon-to-be Governor-General of the Dominion of Pakistan, outlined his vision of Pakistan in an address to the Constituent Assembly, delivered on 11 August 1947. He spoke of an inclusive and impartial government, religious freedom, rule of law and equality for all.

He opened by saying the Assembly had two tasks: Writing a provisional constitution and governing the country meantime. He continued with a list of urgent problems: 
 Law and order, so life, property and religious beliefs are protected for all.
 Bribery
 Black-marketing
 Nepotism

Next he discussed at length the partition, saying many were dissatisfied with the details but a united India would never have worked. He urged forgiveness of bygone quarrels among Pakistanis, so all can be ". . . first, second and last a citizen of this State with equal rights . . .".  Pointing out that England in past centuries had settled its fierce sectarian persecutions, he proposed that "in course of time Hindus would cease to be Hindus and Muslims would cease to be Muslims, not in the religious sense, because that is the personal faith of each individual, but in the political sense as citizens of the State."

He concluded by quoting a friendly, official message from the United States.

21st century 
2007 being the 60th anniversary of Jinnah's speech prompted the Pakistani religious minorities, including Christians, Hindus and Sikhs to hold a large rally to celebrate Jinnah's legacy at the Minar-e-Pakistan calling for the implementation of Jinnah's vision in letter and spirit.

L K Advani, Indian politician, visited Pakistan in June 2005. He created a scandal in India, by referring to Jinnah as a great leader and described his speech to the Constituent Assembly as a truly secular charter, worthy of emulation. At Jinnah's Mausoleum, he wrote:

There are many people who leave an irreversible stamp on history. But there are few who actually create history. Qaed-e-Azam Mohammed Ali Jinnah was one such rare individual. In his early years, leading luminary of freedom struggle Sarojini Naidu described Jinnah as an ambassador of Hindu-Muslim unity. His address to the Constituent Assembly of Pakistan on 11 August 1947 is really a classic and a forceful espousal of a secular state in which every citizen would be free to follow his own religion. The State shall make no distinction between the citizens on the grounds of faith. My respectful homage to this great man.

Advani came under intense criticism from his own party, the Hindu Nationalist Bharatiya Janata Party, which has long blamed Jinnah for being solely responsible for India's partition along communal lines.  Ultimately, Advani was forced to quit as party chief, despite vindication from the media.

References

Further reading 
 Ian Bryant Wells Ambassador of Hindu Muslim Unity: Jinnah's Early Politics (2005), New Delhi
 Naidu, Sarojini Advocate of Hindu Muslim Unity Bombay 1917
 Ajeet, Javed Secular and Nationalist Jinnah JNU Press Delhi
 http://www.pakistani.org/pakistan/legislation/constituent_address_11aug1947.html
 Syed Qasim Mehmood "Message of Quaid-e-Azam"
 Quaid-e-Azam Speaks Published by Anjuman-e-Khuddam ul Quran, Karachi

External links 
http://pakistaniat.com/2006/08/12/pictures-of-the-day-aazadi-mubarak/
http://www.cobrapost.com/documents/JinnahSecularist.htm
http://www.milligazette.com/Archives/2005/01-15July05-Print-Edition/011507200552.ht* 
http://www.hartford-hwp.com/archives/52/006.html
https://www.youtube.com/watch?v=n0UQ6VoceXY Jinnah's first Presidential Address (11 August 1947) 

Pakistan Movement
Muhammad Ali Jinnah
1947 in Pakistan
1947 speeches